Karmir Shuka or Girmizi Bazar is a village de facto in the Martuni Province of the breakaway Republic of Artsakh, de jure in the Khojavend District of Azerbaijan, in the disputed region of Nagorno-Karabakh. The village has an ethnic Armenian population, and had an Armenian majority in 1989.

Etymology 
The name of the village was Krasny Bazar during the Soviet Union, meaning "Red Market" in Russian.  The Armenian name, and the Azerbaijani rendering, also mean "Red Market".

History 
During the Soviet period, the village was a part of the Martuni District of the Nagorno-Karabakh Autonomous Oblast.

Historical heritage sites 
Historical heritage sites in and around the village include Tnjri, a 2,000-year-old Oriental Plane, the 12th/13th-century village of Mavas, a 12th/13th-century khachkar, a cemetery from between the 17th and 18th centuries, the 17th-century monastic complex of Yerek Mankuk in Mavas, the church of Surb Astvatsatsin built in 1731 near the nearby village of Skhtorashen, and the 18th-century St. George's Chapel Church.

Economy and culture 
The population is mainly engaged in agriculture and animal husbandry. As of 2015, the village has a municipal building, a house of culture, a secondary school, a kindergarten, eight shops, and a medical centre. The community of Karmir Shuka includes the village of Skhtorashen.

Demographics 
The village had 926 inhabitants in 2005, and 1,113 inhabitants in 2015.

Gallery

References

External links 

 
 

Populated places in Martuni Province
Populated places in Khojavend District